Forestville Eagles is a NBL1 Central club based in Adelaide, South Australia. The club fields both a men's and women's team. The club is a division of the overarching Forestville Eagles Basketball Club (FEBC), the major administrative basketball organisation in the region. The Eagles play their home games at Wayville Sports Centre.

Club history

Early years
The early remnants of the Eagles stems back to 1953, when the FEBC was established as West Torrens. 1957 saw the formation of the South Australian State League with both a men's and women's competition. West Torrens, trading as the Eagles, entered a team into both competitions. By 1958 and 1959, West Torrens were in back-to-back men's grand finals; both resulted in losses to North Adelaide. The women's team also made grand finals in 1958, 1959 and 1960, all resulting in losses.

In 1972, the women's team collected the club's first ever championship, before defending their title in 1973. They went on to finish runners-up in 1975 and 1976. The West Torrens men made three more grand finals in 1970, 1974 and 1979, with 1974 seeing the Eagles collect their first ever men's championship.

NBL
Following their grand final appearance in 1979, the West Torrens Eagles entered the National Basketball League (NBL) in 1980. The team changed names in 1981 to the Forestville Eagles, but success did not follow; they won just 12 games over two seasons, and as a result, they returned to the SA State League in 1982.

Return to State League
Upon returning to the State League, Forestville made the 1982 grand final, where they lost to West Adelaide. After further grand final defeats in 1987 and 1989, Forestville claimed their second men's title in 1990 with a 94–88 win over South Adelaide in the championship decider.

The women's team claimed their first title under the Forestville moniker in 2001, before winning two more titles in 2003 and 2005. The men also claimed championships in 2003 and 2006. Between 2009 and 2011, the women claimed a three-peat, before the men claimed their own three-peat between 2011 and 2013. In 2019, both teams were crowned Premier League champions.

NBL Season by season

References

External links
FEBC's official website

Premier League (Australia) teams
Defunct National Basketball League (Australia) teams
Basketball clubs in Adelaide
Basketball teams established in 1953
1953 establishments in Australia
Sporting clubs in Adelaide